Caros Amigos (Portuguese for Dear friends) was a monthly alternative Brazilian magazine based in São Paulo.

History and profile
Caros Amigos was established in April 1997 by a group of professionals, including journalists, publicists, writers and intellectuals. Sérgio de Souza, the co-founder and editor of the magazine, died on 25 March 2008. The magazine focuses on politics, social issues and culture from a left wing point of view.

Caros Amigos was published in São Paulo and distributed throughout the country by Editora Casa Amarela. The magazine features articles from a large spectrum of left-wing authors, such as José Arbex, and Frei Betto, which is now an objector of Lula.

In March 2013 eleven journalists of Caros Amigos were fired due to their protest over poor working conditions.

In December 2017 the magazine announced it would cease publishing its print edition, becoming a digital only magazine.

Notable contributors

Frei Betto
Fidel Castro 
Ferréz 

Ana Miranda

Eduardo Suplicy 

Edu Montesanti

References

External links
Caros Amigos official website

1997 establishments in Brazil
2017 disestablishments in Brazil
Alternative magazines
Cultural magazines
Defunct magazines published in Brazil
Defunct political magazines
Magazines established in 1997
Magazines disestablished in 2017
Monthly magazines published in Brazil
Mass media in São Paulo
Political magazines published in Brazil
Portuguese-language magazines
Online magazines with defunct print editions